Wrockwardine  is a civil parish in the district of Telford and Wrekin, Shropshire, England.  It contains 56 listed buildings that are recorded in the National Heritage List for England.  Of these, one is listed at Grade I, the highest of the three grades, four are at Grade II*, the middle grade, and the others are at Grade II, the lowest grade.  The parish contains villages and smaller settlements, including Wrockwardine, Admaston, Allscott, Leaton, and Walcot, and is otherwise rural.  Most of the listed buildings are houses and associated structures, cottages, farmhouses and farm buildings, many of which are timber framed.  The other listed buildings include churches, items in churchyards, a country house and associated structures, a milepost, a former toll house, a school, almshouses, a hotel, and a rifle target gallery.


Key

Buildings

References

Citations

Sources

Lists of buildings and structures in Shropshire